Circuit Italia is a permanent race track under construction in the Hunter Region of New South Wales, Australia, 27km north of Newcastle.

History
Planning for a permanent circuit alongside the existing Ringwood Motor Racing Complex in Port Stephens began in 2013, with local businessman Matthew Higgins confirming AU$12 million of investment in the project in July 2016. Construction began on the circuit – named after its address on Italia Road – in 2017, with 30% of the project completed prior to a hiatus related to Higgins' other projects.

References

External links
Circuit website

Motorsport venues in New South Wales
Sport in Newcastle, New South Wales